Census Division No. 4 is a Statistics Canada statistical division that comprises the areas of the province of Newfoundland and Labrador called St. George's. It covers a land area of 7087.65 km² and had a population of 20,387 at the 2016 census.

Towns
Cape St. George
Gallants
Kippens
Lourdes
Port au Port East
Port au Port West-Aguathuna-Felix Cove
St. George's
Stephenville
Stephenville Crossing

Unorganized subdivisions
Subdivision A (including Codroy, Cape Anguille, Doyles, South Branch)
Subdivision B (including Highlands, Jeffrey’s, Robinsons)
 Subdivision C (including St. Teresa, Flat Bay, Barachois Brook)
 Subdivision D (including Fox Island River)
 Subdivision E (including Mainland)

Demographics

References

Sources

004